"Smokie, Part 2" is a 1959 instrumental by Bill Black's Combo.  The single was the first of four entries on the R&B chart and was successful, where it made to number one for four weeks, in early 1960.  "Smokie, Part 2" also hit the top 20 on the pop singles chart.

Chart positions

References

1959 singles
1950s instrumentals
1959 songs
Song articles with missing songwriters